Channel 2, also called "The Second Channel" was an Israeli commercial television channel. It started doing experimental broadcasts funded by the television tax. The channel started commercial broadcasting on 4 November 1993 regulated and managed by The Second Authority for Television and Radio. In its first years, the channel was operated by three broadcasters ("Keshet", "Reshet", and "Telad"), and in 2005 only two broadcasters were left while "Telad" stopped broadcasting due to its loss in the Second Authority's auction.

On 31 October 2017, 24 years after the Channel started broadcasting, it got closed and split into two new channels: Keshet 12 and Reshet 13. The News Company that was founded alongside the Channel continued to broadcast news to both of the channels in parallel despite the split, but a few months after, after a merge between Reshet 13 and Arutz 10 channel, Reshet adopted Arutz 10's news company's broadcast, and the News Company started broadcasting exclusively on Keshet 12.

History

The idea of a second television channel in Israel was first mooted in 1978 when the Israeli government set up a special committee headed by Haim Kovarsky (he) to explore the establishment of a second channel that would not be under supervision of the Israel Broadcasting Authority (IBA) and would be financed by advertising, however the idea of commercial television was rejected by the National Religious Party (NRP), which was part of the ruling coalition at that time. On 23 October 1986, Amnon Rubinstein, the then Minister of Communications, ordered the start of "experimental transmissions" on a second channel, claiming that unless these transmissions had started, the frequencies would have been used by TV networks in neighbouring countries. The first transmissions were aired on UHF channel 21 from Mount Eitanim transmission tower situated on the hills west of Jerusalem. These transmissions, which initially included 2–3 hours of video clips every evening originating from a private TV studio in Jerusalem, expanded gradually to include a full program lineup. At that time the IBA was legally responsible for the channel, but it actually saw it as unexpected competition, tried to prevent its inauguration, and was reluctant to take responsibility for its broadcasts.

In 1986 the Knesset started discussing the law forming the Second Israeli Broadcasting Authority, and in 1990, the Knesset passed a law that paved the way for the establishment of commercial television in Israel. The goal was to enhance pluralism and create competition. Channel 2 began broadcasting on 4 November 1993. Three concessionaires were chosen: Keshet, Telad and Reshet. The concessionaires received a broadcasting contract for one decade and worked out a rotation agreement amongst themselves.

In 2005, the Ministry of Communications announced that two concessionaires would receive broadcasting contracts for the following decade. Of the four competitors – the three existing concessionaries, and a new operator called Kan (unrelated to the Israeli Public Broadcasting Corporation, which would only be established 12 years afterwards) – Keshet and Reshet were chosen. Telad, which lost the bid, stopped broadcasting on Channel 2 in October 2005. Keshet and Reshet broadcast 4 days a week, rotating every two years. In 2011, Channel 2 installed a new digital system to preserve news content that was stored on aging videotapes and manage its archive library.

Experimental broadcasts 
Channel 2 started its experimental broadcasts in September 1986. Until that time, Channel 1 was the only channel broadcasting in Israel. When the broadcasting started, a test card was shown and in October of the same year the channel started showing photographs of Israel's landscapes and instructions on how to receive the transmissions. On 23 October 1986, Channel 2 started broadcasting music videos. This is considered the beginning of the Experimental Channel 2's broadcasts. In its first months, the broadcasts were two-three hours long. In February 1987, the Demjanjuk trial was broadcast in Channel 2. In the same year's independence day, the experimental channel did a live news broadcast during the entire holiday.

In 1987, there was a labor strike in the IBA and Channel 1 did not broadcast for a period of 52 days. During the strike, Channel 2 got a permission to expand its broadcasting hours and to broadcast movies and various imported TV shows.  Later, the government let Channel 2 broadcast in Channel 1's frequencies. This was deemed as an attempt from the government to stop the strike. During the strike, Ida Nudel arrived in Israel and the experimental channel was directed to live broadcast her welcoming ceremony. With the end of the strike, the IBA stopped working with Channel 2 and Channel 2 stopped airing its special productions. In 1990, the Knesset passed the Second Israeli Broadcasting Authority law and Channel 2 officially became an independent channel.

Commercial broadcasting 
After seven years of experimental broadcasts, the bid to determine Channel 2's franchisees ended. The chosen companies were "Keshet", "Reshet", and "Telad". The bid ended on 3 November 1993. In parallel, Channel 2's news company was founded.

On 4 November 1993, Channel 2 started broadcasting as a commercial channel that is not funded by a TV tax and aired commercials. The news company opened the broadcast with a short news briefing with Ya'akov Eilon. The three franchisees got a contract for six years and later, it was extended to another six years. The channel became quickly the most watched channel in Israel.

Second bid 
In 2005, 12 years after Channel 2 started broadcasting, the Second Authority did another bid for only two franchisees. All three existing franchisees of Channel 2 applied for the bid and also "Kan Group" which was founded for this bid and did not broadcast before. "Noga Tikshoret" applied for the bid first as an independent franchisee but then applied along with "Reshet" under the name "Reshet-Noga". On 13 April, "Keshet" and "Reshet" won the bid. In November 2005, "Telad" stopped its broadcasting on Channel 2 and the broadcasting week was filled by "Keshet" and "Reshet" broadcasting.

Switching to widescreen and HD broadcasting 
Since the end of 2012, Channel 2's franchisees started gradually changing their content to widescreen format and during 2013, "Keshet" started broadcasting in 16:9 aspect ratio and "Reshet" followed on later. Since 2014, most of both franchisees' contents were broadcast in 16:9 although the News Company kept broadcasting in 4:3, as well as old programs' reruns.

In 2010, "Reshet" asked the Second Authority for HD broadcasting. The request was turned down because all commercial channels had to go through the Second Authorities' systems and they did not work with HD broadcasts. Both of the franchisees did not broadcast in HD before Channel 2's closure, although by that time, most of their productions were shot in HD and were available to watch in HD on the VOD and the internet.

As a part of Channel 2's splitting in November 2017, "Keshet" and "Reshet" moved to broadcast in separate channels and one of the requirements to broadcast was that the broadcaster had to broadcast in HD quality.

Channel 2's splitting 
In 2014, a bill to split Channel 2 and to end the franchise period in April 2015 was suggested and the broadcasters will broadcast in separate channels. "Keshet" and "Reshet" declared that they prefer to keep broadcasting in Channel 2 until 2017. Eventually, the bill did not pass.

On 26 April 2017, "Keshet" and "Reshet" declared that from November 2017 "Keshet" will broadcast in Channel 12, "Reshet" will broadcast in Channel 13 and Channel 22 will not be used for four months after the split.

On 31 October 2017, from 21:30 to midnight, "Keshet" did a broadcast to conclude Channel 2's broadcasts. The broadcast was conducted by Erez Tal and many of Keshet's talents participated in it. A broadcasting hour was given to "Reshet" to say goodbye to Channel 2.

Before the split, the franchisees started promoting the new channels with their programs. Since the law that splits the channel, the franchisees started showing their logos in the bottom left corner of their broadcasts.

The news company will keep existing under the ownership of both franchisees until October 2018, when "Reshet" and Channel 10 will merge. Most of the news company's contents are broadcast in parallel on both channels except for the commercial breaks and the weather forecast's sponsorship ads. During the news company's broadcasts, the news company's logo is shown under the channel's logo.

In order for "Reshet" and Channel 10 to merge, Reshet will sell its share in the news company to "Keshet".

Effect of Channel 2's splitting on Channel 10 and 33

Channel 10 
In addition to Channel 2's splitting, Channel 10 will also move to a different channel. Channel 10 won channel 14 in the bid for a price of one Shekel and 54 Agorot. The channel crowdfunded the purchase in a Headstart project.

On 19 September 2017, due to Channel 2's splitting and the move to channel 14, the channel rebranded to a verbal branding - "עשר (ten)" - instead of the old channel's number.

Less than one year after the split, "Reshet" and Channel 10's shareholders decided to merge.

Makan 33 
Although there is no connection between the commercial channels to IPBC's channels, Channel 2's split might affect the viewing habits of Israel's Arab citizens. In October 2017, the second authority decided to transfer Makan 33 to the second array of Idan+ (DVB-T2) and leave "Keshet 12" and "Reshet 13" in the current array (DVB-T). The meaning is that viewers without an Idan+ receiver that supports DVB-T2, could not watch "Makan 33" after 1 November 2017. The reason for this decision is because of "Makan 33"'s low rating and since it broadcasts only for several hours each day. IPBC's chairman, Gil Omer resisted the decision.

See also

List of programs broadcast by Channel 2 (Israel)
List of television channels in Israel
Keshet 12
Reshet 13

References

External links

 Channel 2 – The English Edition by Keshet Media Group
 The Establishment of Channel 2 at The Second Authority for Television and Radio website

 
1993 establishments in Israel
Hebrew-language mass media
Mass media in Tel Aviv
Television channels and stations established in 1993
Television channels and stations disestablished in 2017
Television channels in Israel
Defunct television channels in Israel